Luye railway station is a railway station located in Luye Township, Taitung County, Taiwan. It is located on the Taitung line and is operated by Taiwan Railways.

References

1922 establishments in Taiwan
Railway stations opened in 1922
Railway stations in Taitung County
Railway stations served by Taiwan Railways Administration